Lisanne Soemanta (born 1 May 1987) is a Dutch professional racing cyclist.

See also
 2014 Parkhotel Valkenburg Continental Team season

References

External links
 

1987 births
Living people
Dutch female cyclists
People from Uitgeest
Cyclists from North Holland
21st-century Dutch women